The 1888 Championship of Australia was an Australian rules football series held in Adelaide between 6 October and 13 October 1888.

The championship was contested by the premiers of the VFA, South Melbourne and the premiers of the SAFA, Norwood.

All matches were played at Kensington Oval in Adelaide, South Australia.

The series was won by Norwood 3 games to zero, giving Norwood its 1st Championship of Australia Title.

This was the first Championship of Australia held, but the only one to be held as a series, with subsequent editions held as a single championship match.

Matches

References 

Championship of Australia
1888 in Australian sport
Championship of Australia
October 1888 sports events